Munro Lake is an inland lake located in Cheboygan County on the northern tip of Michigan's lower peninsula. The lake discharges into Douglas Lake and, ultimately, into the East Branch Maple River. Much of the lakeshore is publicly owned, being part of the Mackinaw State Forest.

The Tip of the Mitt Watershed Council characterizes Munro Lake as a groundwater-fed, relatively shallow lake. Carved by glaciers, it now provides a home for northern pike, bass, and panfish.

See also
List of lakes in Michigan

References 

Bodies of water of Cheboygan County, Michigan
Lakes of Michigan